Walid Haj Yahia (also known as Walid Sadik, 1936 – 21 March 2015) was an Israeli Arab former politician who served as a member of the Knesset for the Left Camp of Israel and Meretz.

Biography
Born in Tayibe during the Mandate era, Haj Yahia studied at the Hebrew University of Jerusalem, gaining a BA in sociology and political science. He worked as headmaster of a high school in Tayibe for 23 years, and was a member of the Teachers' Union's central committee.

A member of the Left Camp of Israel, he was on the party's list for the 1977 elections. Although he missed out on a seat, he entered the Knesset on 13 February 1981 as a replacement for Uri Avnery. However, he lost his seat in the elections in June that year as the party failed to cross the electoral threshold.

After the 1992 elections he returned to the Knesset on the Meretz list. On 4 August he was appointed Deputy Minister of Agriculture and Rural Development in Yitzhak Rabin's government, a role he also held under Shimon Peres' brief tenure as Prime Minister after Rabin's assassination. He was re-elected in 1996, but lost his seat in the 1999 elections.

References

External links
 
Tom Segev, Aug.03, 2012: Between his state and his people. In a new memoir, a former Arab-Israeli Knesset member tells his story, from the Nakba to heart-to-heart talks with Rabin and Arafat, Haaretz

1936 births
2015 deaths
Date of birth missing
Place of death missing
20th-century Israeli educators
Arab members of the Knesset
Arab people in Mandatory Palestine
Deputy ministers of Israel
Hebrew University of Jerusalem Faculty of Social Sciences alumni
Israeli trade unionists
Left Camp of Israel politicians
Meretz politicians
Members of the 9th Knesset (1977–1981)
Members of the 13th Knesset (1992–1996)
Members of the 14th Knesset (1996–1999)
People from Tayibe